Alessandro Durante (born 27 December 1997) is an Italian footballer who plays as a forward.

Club career
Durante played 9 match in the 2017–18 Serie D season. His team, Albissola promoted to the Serie C. He made his professional debut in the Coppa Italia Serie C on 10 October 2018 against Alessandria, coming on as a substitute in the 75th minute for Gabriele Gibilterra.

References

Sources
 
 
 

1997 births
Living people
Association football forwards
Italian footballers
Albissola 2010 players
Serie C players
Serie D players